Henri Losch (16 July 1931 – 26 December 2021) was a Luxembourgish actor, writer, and teacher.

Life and career
Losch taught at the Conservatory of Esch-sur-Alzette and acted with the Lëtzebuerger Theater from 1962 to 1973. He worked for RTL and sought to defend the Luxembourgish language.

He died on 26 December 2021, at the age of 90.

Bibliography
Grouss a Kleng am Krich (1985)
Eng Zaubertéingeschicht, e musikalescht Mäerchen mam OPL
Tun Deutsch (1995)
En drolege Schlasshär (2002)
Am grujelegen Tunnel (2003)
E Bouf erzielt (2004)
En Däiwelsgesiicht (2005)
Häerzerkinnek. E Krimi (2007)
Lëtzebuerg, e Land a seng Leit (2007)
De Geescht an där aler Brauerei e Roman fir Kanner mat Biller vum Patty Thielen (2009)
Chrëschtdag hautdesdaags, e Chrëschtmusical
Koppeges a Bosseges. E Schoulmeeschter erzielt (2012)
D’Rennscheier – E Guide erzielt (2015)
Mamer Meng Gemeng - Wissenswertes aus Geschichte, Geographie und Kultur (2015)
Mamer Ma commune - Informations concernant sa géographie, son histoire et sa culture (2015)
De Kregéiler - E Frënd vun der Natur erzielt (2017)
Sympatesch Kauzen (2018)

Filmography
 (1983)
 (1984)
 (1985)
 (1989)
 (1989)
 (1993)
 (1997)
 (2010)
 (2012)
 (2013)
 (2017)

References

1931 births
2021 deaths
Luxembourgian male film actors
Luxembourgian male writers
Luxembourgian educators
People from Diekirch
20th-century Luxembourgian male actors
20th-century Luxembourgian writers
20th-century male writers
21st-century Luxembourgian male actors
21st-century Luxembourgian writers
21st-century male writers